Bengang is a settlement in Sarawak, Malaysia.

Neighbouring settlements include:

References

 
Populated places in Sarawak